Yun Nam-jin (윤남진, born 5 August 1962) is a South Korean fencer. He competed in the individual and team épée events at the 1984 and 1988 Summer Olympics. He placed 28th and 33rd individually and seventh with the South Korean team.

References

External links
Yoon Nam-jin Fencing Club website 
 

1962 births
Living people
South Korean male épée fencers
South Korean épée fencers
Olympic fencers of South Korea
Fencers at the 1984 Summer Olympics
Fencers at the 1988 Summer Olympics
Asian Games medalists in fencing
Fencers at the 1986 Asian Games
Fencers at the 1990 Asian Games
Asian Games gold medalists for South Korea
Medalists at the 1986 Asian Games
Medalists at the 1990 Asian Games